Desloratadine/pseudoephedrine, sold under the brand name Clarinex-D among others, is a medication used for the treatment of seasonal allergic rhinitis.

Desloratadine/pseudoephedrine was approved for use in the United States in 2005 and in the European Union in July 2007.

Medical uses 
Desloratadine/pseudoephedrine is indicated for the symptomatic treatment of seasonal allergic rhinitis when accompanied by nasal congestion.

References

Further reading

External links 
 

Amphetamine alkaloids
Benzocycloheptapyridines
Chloroarenes
Decongestants
H1 receptor antagonists
Human drug metabolites
Methamphetamine
Norepinephrine releasing agents
Peripherally selective drugs
Phenylethanolamines
Piperidines